Ritza Papaconstantinou (born in Brännkyrka, Sweden on 2 March 1972) is a famous Greek-Swedish television presenter at SVT since 2004. She has also taken acting roles in television series most notably Känd från TV.

She is the sister of the Swedish-Greek songwriter and record producer Alex Papaconstantinou.

References

1972 births
Living people
Entertainers from Stockholm
People from Södermanland
Swedish people of Greek descent
Radio and television announcers